Grădina is a commune in Constanța County, Northern Dobruja, Romania.

The commune includes three villages:
 Grădina (historical names: Toxoff or Tocsof)
 Casian (historical name: Șeramet)
 Cheia (historical name: Chirișlic)

Demographics
At the 2011 census, Grădina had 973 Romanians (94.93%), 3 Turks (0.29%), 47 Tatars (4.59%), 2 others (0.20%).

References

Communes in Constanța County
Localities in Northern Dobruja